Benjamin Bennet may refer to:
 Benjamin Bennet (politician)
 Benjamin Bennet (minister)

See also
 Benjamin Bennett (disambiguation)